Carex humboldtiana is a tussock-forming species of perennial sedge in the family Cyperaceae. It is native to parts of Central America and South America.

See also
List of Carex species

References

humboldtiana
Plants described in 1855
Taxa named by Ernst Gottlieb von Steudel
Flora of Brazil
Flora of Colombia
Flora of Costa Rica
Flora of Guatemala
Flora of Honduras
Flora of Mexico
Flora of Nicaragua
Flora of Panama
Flora of Venezuela